Sheila Margaret McHale (born 1 September 1953) born is a former Labor Party MP in the Government of Western Australia. Prior to retirement, she served as Member for Kenwick and Minister for Disability Services, Tourism, Culture and the Arts, and Consumer Protection.

Born in Yorkshire, England she emigrated to Western Australia in 1978. She was first elected to State Parliament in 1996 and served as the Shadow Minister for Health, the Arts and Heritage. During this period, she spent three years as an elected councillor for the City of South Perth.

In 2001, she was re-elected to state parliament as Gallop took power and undertook the position of Cabinet Minister, as Minister for Community Development, Women's Interests, Tourism, Seniors and Youth; Disability Services; and Culture and the Arts.

In March 2008, McHale announced that she would retire and not contest the upcoming State election. In the 2008 election the seat of Kenwick was abolished and replaced with the seat of Gosnells. Chris Tallentire was preselected and won the new seat for the ALP despite a swing of 5.9% against them.

References

1953 births
Australian Labor Party members of the Parliament of Western Australia
Curtin University alumni
Living people
Members of the Western Australian Legislative Assembly
21st-century Australian politicians
Women members of the Western Australian Legislative Assembly
Western Australian local councillors
21st-century Australian women politicians